Shipai (formerly transliterated as Shihpai Station until 2003) is a metro station in Shipai, Taipei, Taiwan served by Taipei Metro. In the past, the station belonged to the now-defunct Tamsui railway line.

Station overview

The two-level elevated station features an island platform and has two exits. One exit is located at the intersection of Shipai Rd., Donghua St., and Xian St facing north and the newly built exit is at the other end of the station facing south.

This station connects to Beitou Refuse Incineration Plant, Children's Art Museum in Taipei, National Research Institute of Chinese Medicine, National Taipei University of Nursing and Health Science, National Yang Ming Chiao Tung University, Taipei American School, Taipei Veterans General Hospital and University of Taipei.

History
This station was opened as Qili-an on 17 August 1915 under the Taipei Railway Administration, and was renamed Shipai after the war. The old TRA entrance was at Ziqiang Street, Lane 141. It was closed on 15 July 1988 and reopened on 28 March 1997. The second exit opened for use on 20 November 2010.

Station layout

References

1915 establishments in Taiwan
Railway stations opened in 1915
Railway stations closed in 1988
Railway stations opened in 1997
Tamsui–Xinyi line stations